Federalism was adopted, as a constitutional principle, in Australia on 1 January 1901. Relatively few changes have been made in terms of the formal constitution since Australian federation occurred; in practice, however, the Commonwealth government has increasingly assumed a position of dominance through the acquisition and negotiation of additional powers and responsibilities.

References

Political history of Australia
History of Australia (1901–1945)
History of Australia (1945–present)
Federalism in Australia